Englewood is a predominantly residential neighborhood in the eastern section of Columbus, Georgia, United States.

Neighborhoods in Columbus, Georgia
Columbus metropolitan area, Georgia